Mathrin Simmers (born 3 March 1988) is a South African rugby sevens player. 

Simmers competed for South Africa at the 2018 Commonwealth Games in Gold Coast, Queensland, Australia. She was selected again to represent South Africa at the 2018 Rugby World Cup Sevens in San Francisco.

Simmers was named in South Africa's squad for the 2022 Commonwealth Games in Birmingham where they finished in seventh place. She was later selected to represent South Africa at the 2022 Rugby World Cup Sevens in Cape Town.

References 

Living people
1988 births
Female rugby sevens players
South Africa international women's rugby sevens players
Rugby sevens players at the 2022 Commonwealth Games